Hery Prasetyo (born April 28, 1985) is an Indonesian professional footballer who plays as a goalkeeper for Liga 2 club PSKC Cimahi.

Career 
On December 4, 2014, he signed with Persebaya ISL (Bhayangkara).

Hounors

Olympic
 Pekan Olahraga Nasional  Gold Medal: 2008

Club
PSM Makassar
 Piala Indonesia: 2019

References

External links 

 
 Hery Prasetyo at Liga Indonesia

1985 births
Association football goalkeepers
Indonesian Muslims
Living people
Indonesian footballers
Liga 1 (Indonesia) players
Liga 2 (Indonesia) players
Indonesian Premier Division players
Persibo Bojonegoro players
Persik Kediri players
Gresik United players
Bhayangkara F.C. players
Madura United F.C. players
PSM Makassar players
PSG Pati players
Sportspeople from Malang
Sportspeople from East Java
People from Malang